Strážov, at , is the highest mountain in the Strážov Mountains, part of the Inner Western Carpathians, in Trenčín and Žilina Regions, Slovakia.

The mountain is protected by  National Nature Reserve Strážov, which belongs to Strážov Mountains Protected Landscape Area. The National Nature Reserve was declared in 1981 and covers an area of 4.8 km² (1.85 mi²).

The nearest villages are Zliechov and Čičmany.

References

External links

Mountains of Slovakia
Mountains of the Western Carpathians